The Cane River rises at twin sources in the vicinity of Derby Peak in eastern Saint Andrew Parish, Jamaica from where it flows south to the Caribbean Sea.

See also
List of rivers of Jamaica

References

 GEOnet Names Server 
Ford, Jos C. and Finlay, A.A.C. (1908).The Handbook of Jamaica. Jamaica Government Printing Office

External links
Aerial view of the twin sources of the Cane River
Aerial view of the mouth of the Cane River

Rivers of Jamaica